Bodenbach is an Ortsgemeinde – a municipality belonging to a Verbandsgemeinde, a kind of collective municipality – in the Vulkaneifel district in Rhineland-Palatinate, Germany. It belongs to the Verbandsgemeinde of Kelberg, whose seat is in the like-named municipality.

Geography

Location 
The municipality lies in the Vulkaneifel, a part of the Eifel known for its volcanic history, geographical and geological features, and even ongoing activity today, including gases that sometimes well up from the earth.

Politics

Municipal council 
The council is made up of 6 council members, who were elected by majority vote at the municipal election held on 7 June 2009, and the honorary mayor as chairman.

Coat of arms 
The German blazon reads: Im goldenen Schild, durch blauen Schräglinksbalken geteilt, oben eine schwarze, dreitürmige Kirche, unten ein grünes Rad mit Lindenblattspeichen.

The municipality’s arms might in English heraldic language be described thus: Or a bend sinister wavy azure, in dexter chief a church with three towers each with a conical roof sable and in base sinister a wheel spoked of eight, the spokes in the shape of lime leaves pointing away from the hub vert.

The church, a striking building with three towers, is a local landmark. The bend sinister wavy azure (that is, the slanted wavy stripe) is a canting charge meant to refer to the placename ending —bach, German for “brook” (Boden—, on the other hand, means “ground” or “bottom” – it is cognate with the latter – but there is no charge suggesting this part of the name). The spokes in the wheel, shaped like limetree leaves, stand for a very old lime (or linden) at the church, planted to commemorate the wars of liberation in 1813. The wheel itself refers to the municipality’s rural structure, while its tincture, vert (that is, green), stands for the wealth of woodland that the municipality has.

Culture and sightseeing

Buildings 
 Catholic church, Kirchstraße 4, Classicist aisleless church from 1829, expanded and made taller in 1950, beam cross from mid 18th century
 Hauptstraße – basalt wayside cross from 1803
 South of the village on the road to Bongard – Way of Our Lady of Sorrows, with seven stations, endowed in 1816, renewed in 1916

Religion 
Bodenbach in der Eifel is the parochial seat of the parish of St. Apollonia Bodenbach to which belong the communities of Bodenbach, Bongard (branch church), Borler (chapel consecrated to Saint Bernard) and Gelenberg (Saint Wendelin’s Chapel). More than 90% of the population belongs to the Roman Catholic Church.

References

External links 
 Bodenbach in the collective municipality’s Web pages 
 Brief portrait of Bodenbach with film at SWR Fernsehen 

Vulkaneifel